Miyahara may refer to:

Miyahara (surname), a Japanese surname
Miyahara, Kumamoto, a former town in Yatsushiro District, Kumamoto Prefecture, Japan
Miyahara Station, a train station in Saitama, Saitama Prefecture, Japan
Miyahara Ice Cream, a confectionery in Taichung, Taiwan